John Kerr was a Scottish amateur football outside left who played in the Scottish League for Queen's Park and Arthurlie.

Personal life 
Allan served as a private in the Army Service Corps (Motor Transport) during the First World War.

Career statistics

References 

Scottish footballers
Queen's Park F.C. players
Year of death missing
British Army personnel of World War I
Scottish Football League players
Place of birth missing
Year of birth missing
Royal Army Service Corps soldiers
Arthurlie F.C. players
Association football outside forwards